{{infobox chef
| name = Elizabeth Chong (AM)
| birth_date = 
| birth_place = Guangzhou, China
| citizenship  = Australia
| occupation = 
| restaurants = Wing Lees (Melbourne)
| style = Traditional chinese 
| television = 

Elizabeth Chong  ( born 27 May 1931) is a Chinese-born Australian celebrity chef, former cooking teacher, author and media and television host and personality.

She is known as a pioneer of the industry, the first celebrity chef and promotor of introducing Traditional Chinese cuisine to Australian.

Biography and career

Chong was born in Guangzhou (formerly known as Canton), China, her family's history in Australia dates back to the 1850s when her grandfather emigrated to the country. Chong was born the daughter of a Chinese mother and Australian citizen of Chinese descent father William Yen Wing Young, she has brother Tony and a sister born in Hong Kong, her mother was told to leave the country under the  White Australia Policy, due to this policy she did not know about the Lunar New Year. celebrations until in her 20s is believed to have created and marketed the most widely used modern recipe of the dim sim, in 1945, a dumpling similar to a Siu Mai at his Melbourne Food Processing operation "Wing Lee". Chong also states her father created the first bean sprout factory in Australia. Chong came to Australia when she was three years old with her mother, father, grandmother and three other children and settled in a residence near the Queen Victoria Markets.  She was educated at Presbyterian Ladies' College, Melbourne.

Chong never aspired to follow the family tradition in the restaurateur business, but rather become a concert pianist or journalist. After a year of being a primary school teacher, she decided she wanted to teach the art of cooking.In 1994, her book The Heritage of Chinese Cooking won the Prix de La Mazille as International Cookbook of the Year.

Chong is best known for her television appearances on Good Morning Australia as well as her Chinese Cooking School (1960- 2016) and Chinese cookbooks including The First Happiness (first published in 1982)

Elizabeth's cooking school started in the late 1950s when she began teaching some of the mothers from her children's state school in the Melbourne suburb of North Balwyn. Her first home recipes were published by Belle Vue State School Mothers' Club. The Cooking School celebrated its 50-year anniversary in 2011. Apart from this as an ambassador for Chinese culture in association with her cooking, she gives guided tours of the Chinatown precinct in Melbourne

In 2003 her series Elizabeth Chong's Tiny Delights aired on television and a companion book of the same name was released.
 
In 2017, Chong appeared on Studio 10, which reunited the cast of Good Morning Australia, including host Bert Newton, his wife Patti Newton, and  regular members of the series including music director John Foreman, Robert "Belvedere" Mascara, Susie Elelman, Rhonda Burchmore, Tonia Todman, Ken James,  Phillip Brady and Moira McLean

References

External links
 Official Website

1931 births
Living people
Australian television presenters
Australian television chefs
Chinese emigrants to Australia
Women chefs
Australian women television presenters
Members of the Order of Australia